Newaygo is a rural city in Newaygo County in the U.S. state of Michigan. The population was 2,471 at the 2020 census.

Geography
The county is considered part of West Michigan.
Newaygo is part of the Roman Catholic Diocese of Grand Rapids.

Geographic features
The Muskegon River flows through the north side of the town.

Major highways

History
Newaygo's recorded history goes back to the 1600s and the French coureur des bois (independent trappers) and, later,  fur company voyageurs that travelled by canoe via the Muskegon River. It was ostensibly named after Chief Nuwagon, an Ojibwe leader who signed the Treaty of Saginaw in 1819, or for an Algonquian word meaning "much water". John Brooks came to harvest lumber in 1836, and was the town's first postmaster in 1847. Proximity to the river made it a center for floating logs to the mills in Muskegon during the lumber boom of the late 1800s.

Demographics

2010 census
As of the census of 2010, there were 1,976 people, 786 households, and 502 families living in the city. The racial makeup of the city was 93.6% White, 0.9% African American, 1.2% Native American, 0.7% Asian, 0.1% Pacific Islander, 1.6% from other races, and 2.0% from two or more races. Hispanic or Latino of any race were 7.3% of the population.

There were 786 households, of which 36.8% had children under the age of 18 living with them, 39.7% were married couples living together, 20.2% had a female householder with no husband present, 3.9% had a male householder with no wife present, and 36.1% were non-families. 30.7% of all households were made up of individuals, and 14.7% had someone living alone who was 65 years of age or older. The average household size was 2.51 and the average family size was 3.10.

The median age in the city was 32.4 years. 29.3% of residents were under the age of 18; 10.5% were between the ages of 18 and 24; 24.7% were from 25 to 44; 21.3% were from 45 to 64; and 14.2% were 65 years of age or older. The gender makeup of the city was 46.1% male and 53.9% female.

2000 census
As of the census of 2000, there were 1,670 people, 620 households, and 450 families living in the city. The racial makeup of the city was 95.87% White, 0.24% African American, 0.24% Native American, 0.12% Asian, 2.34% from other races, and 1.20% from two or more races. Hispanic or Latino of any race were 4.79% of the population.

There were 620 households, out of which 41.6% had children under the age of 18 living with them, 50.8% were married couples living together, 17.9% had a female householder with no husband present, and 27.4% were non-families. 23.7% of all households were made up of individuals, and 7.7% had someone living alone who was 65 years of age or older.  The average household size was 2.69 and the average family size was 3.16.

In the city, the population was spread out, with 33.1% under the age of 18, 10.7% from 18 to 24, 26.1% from 25 to 44, 18.6% from 45 to 64, and 11.5% who were 65 years of age or older. The median age was 30 years. For every 100 females, there were 89.1 males. For every 100 females age 18 and over, there were 84.9 males.

The median income for a household in the city was $32,273, and the median income for a family was $36,023. Males had a median income of $32,763 versus $21,385 for females. The per capita income for the city was $14,643. About 15.2% of families and 16.5% of the population were below the poverty line, including 22.5% of those under age 18 and 6.3% of those age 65 or over.

Climate
The Köppen Climate Classification subtype for this climate is "Dfb". (Warm Summer Continental Climate).

Notable people
 Ella H. Brockway Avann (born 1853), educator
 Roy Bargy, composer and pianist
 Joe Berger, lineman with the Minnesota Vikings of the NFL
 Jack Nitzsche, musician and arranger
 Bertha Yerex Whitman, architect

Notes

External links

City of Newaygo
Newaygo Area Chamber of Commerce

Cities in Newaygo County, Michigan
Grand Rapids metropolitan area
Populated places established in 1847
1847 establishments in Michigan